Mid-Ocean School of Media Arts (MOSMA) is a private vocational institution located in Winnipeg, Manitoba.  

MOSMA was founded in 1994 with a specific focus in delivering education in audio production technology through theoretical and practical study including mentorships with recording artists, audio engineers, and producers. The institution offers a six-month diploma programme (Audio in Media) as well as a series of self-interest part-time courses.

The institution, as legally required, is governed by The Private Vocational Institutions Act and Manitoba Regulation 237/02. This legislation provides consumer protection and ensures that the training gives students the skills and knowledge relevant to their chosen field of employment.

Curriculum

The Audio in Media six-month programme is divided into three terms.  Terms 1 and 2 include initial subjects of study such as acoustics, psychoacoustics, ear training and audio production equipment components such as audio production consoles, microphones, recording media and signal processors. Delivery of curriculum includes both theoretical introduction to subjects followed by hands-on work within three dedicated in school production rooms. Term 3 (Practicums) requires students to complete audio production projects such as music multi-track recording, radio jingle production and sound design for video. Students also complete a Live Sound module hosted by a local Venue with a live band.

The institution utilizes an assessment criteria divided into 40% theoretical/written tests and 60% practical evaluations. The Audio in Media program accepts a maximum enrolment of 15 students.

References

External links
 Manitoba Advanced Education and Literacy
 Mid-Ocean School of Media Arts

Audio engineering schools
Universities and colleges in Winnipeg
West End, Winnipeg
Schools in downtown Winnipeg